Alexei Kondaurov (born 1949) is a former KGB general, former Head Analyst at Yukos, and current member of Russia's State Duma for the Communist Party. Asked about the fact that he is both a Communist and a millionaire, Kondaurov stated "There's no contradiction. Engels was an oligarch and Lenin hardly a vagabond."

References

Further reading

Living people
1949 births
KGB officers
Yukos
Fourth convocation members of the State Duma (Russian Federation)